Al-Mahdi Al-Barghathi is a Libyan National Army officer who served as the Minister of Defense in the Libyan Government of National Accord, from January 2016 until July 2018. He is an army commander from eastern Libya who had formerly served under General Khalifa Haftar during the Second Libyan Civil War before joining the internationally-recognised unity government.

Biography
Al-Barghathi was born in Benghazi and fought in the Libyan Civil War against the forces of Muammar Qaddafi, being among the first officers to join the rebels. In 2014 he joined General Khalifa Haftar's Operation Dignity against the Islamists in the General National Congress and commanded the 204 Tank Brigade. He reportedly became a popular officer in the Libyan armed forces for personally fighting on the front line with the troops.
 
Al-Barghathi's appointment as the minister of defense of the Government of National Accord in January 2016, formed with international support to reunify Libya, caused disagreements with Field Marshal Haftar. The general believes he is not fit for the role and opposes his appointment. Also, Al-Barghathi is an ally of Ibrahim Jadhran, leader of the Petroleum Facilities Guards and rival of Haftar. Al-Barghathi stated he remains loyal to the army as an institution and is determined to run it effectively. The Libyan Air Force chief of staff under Haftar, Saqr Geroushi, said that al-Barghathi should be arrested for becoming the defense minister in the GNA without the commander-in-chief's permission.

It was reported that he personally led Libyan unity government forces during the offensive to retake the city of Sirte from the Islamic State of Iraq and the Levant.

In March 2017, after Haftar's LNA seized control of the oil facilities in eastern Libya, Al-Barghathi was accused of supporting the Benghazi Defense Brigades that fought against the LNA. However, he denied this allegations.

In May 2017, GNA Prime Minister Fayez Seraj announced that Al-Barghathi was suspended as defense minister after being suspected of involving in the Brak Al-Shati massacre.

By December 2017 it appeared that he is no longer suspended and resumed his role as defense minister. Early that month, he visited Libyan soldiers receiving medical treatment in neighboring Tunisia.

In July 2018 he was removed from the office after disagreements with Prime Minister Fayez al-Sarraj.

References

Libyan generals
People of the First Libyan Civil War
People from Benghazi
Living people
Year of birth missing (living people)